The Fiescher Gabelhorn is a mountain of the Bernese Alps, overlooking Konkordiaplatz in the canton of Valais.

References

External links
 Fiescher Gabelhorn on Hikr

Mountains of the Alps
Alpine three-thousanders
Mountains of Switzerland
Mountains of Valais
Bernese Alps
Three-thousanders of Switzerland